HSBC Bank Georgia JSC was a bank in Georgia. It opened its doors for business in Tbilisi in June 2008. It was a locally-licensed joint venture between the HSBC Holdings Plc — which held 70% ownership — and members of overseas businesses who held 30%.

In 2011, HSBC announced that it would close its Georgian business.

References 

Banks of Georgia (country)
Banks established in 2008
Banks disestablished in 2011